Poecilochaetidae is a family of marine worms within the Polychaeta. It is a monotypic family containing the single genus Poecilochaetus. Members of this family are benthic worms that burrow into soft sediments.

References

Annelid families
Canalipalpata